Canons Park is a public park and the name of its surrounding residential area, in the Stanmore district of the London Borough of Harrow, north west London. Canons Park was a country estate which partially survives today as a public park. St. Lawrence's Church, the parish church of Little Stanmore, and the accompanying Chandos Mausoleum are located here.

Etymology and history
"Canons" refers to the canons or monks of the  Augustinian priory of St Bartholomew in Smithfield, London. In mediaeval times the site was a part of the endowment of the Priory of St Bartholomew's which operated St Bartholomew's Hospital in London. Following the dissolution of the monasteries the land was sold in 1543 into private hands. A  large house was built there during the 16th and 17th centuries at one time owned by Thomas Lake, James I's Chancellor of the Exchequer.

Canons Park is largely located on the site of the magnificent early 18th-century country house Cannons built between 1713 and 1725 by James Brydges, 1st Duke of Chandos. A few years after the Duke's death in 1744 this house was also demolished.  The current building on the site housing the North London Collegiate School was built about 1760 by the gentleman cabinet-maker William Hallett. The original house-site, transformed into ambitious Edwardian gardens was bought in 1929 by the school for £17,500. A large portion of the original gardens of James Brydges' house now form the public pleasure gardens of Canons Park. The modern park includes the Memorial Gardens, a folly known as 'the Temple' (not to be confused with a different folly of the same name within the North London Collegiate School grounds) and an orchard.

Canons Drive follows the original path of the entrance to James Brydges' house, retaining the two large pillars which acted as gateposts where it met the Edgware Road. The remains of a second, raised, carriageway running from Cannons can be traced through Canons Park in the direction of Whitchurch Lane. A  lake and separate duck pond also formed part of the original Cannons Estate and survive within the boundaries of the Canons Drive residential area.

Canons Park

Canons Park,  in size, is listed as Grade II on the Register of Parks and Gardens. The designation recognises features surviving from the ducal park (including two lakes, the Basin Lake and the Seven Acre Lake) as well as more recent features. The park contains several listed buildings.

The King George V Memorial Garden is a walled garden in the park. This area was originally part of the duke's kitchen gardens and was re-designed in the 1930s, after the park became public. The garden reflects the 1930s period, with a structure of evergreens highlighted by seasonal displays. It features a central square pool surrounded by a raised terrace with steps, formal flower beds and a pavilion. In 2006-7 the garden and the park were restored with support of the Heritage Lottery Fund.

St Lawrence Whitchurch

Situated adjacent to the public park is the remarkable church of St Lawrence Whitchurch, the parish church of Little Stanmore. The name Whitchurch had some currency as an alternative name for the parish. The walls and ceiling of the dramatic interior are covered with paintings. The panels on the ceiling are attributed to Louis Laguerre and show miracles taken mostly from St John's Gospel. The ceiling above the altar depicts the Adoration of Jehovah. Behind the altar is an imitation sky, lit by a concealed window which is characteristic of the baroque style of continental Europe. The tradition and style suggests that the whole of the ceiling was painted by Louis Laguerre. The paintings of the Nativity and the Descent from the Cross, which are seen on either side of the altar, and the Transfiguration, which is above the Duke's Pew, are attributed to Antonio Bellucci.

Most of the interior woodwork is original and is attributed to Grinling Gibbons. This includes the organ case which is carved with cherubs, pea pods and other typical Grinling Gibbons decorations. The famous composer George Frideric Handel was employed by Brydges in 1717-18 as his composer-in-residence. At the time Brydges had yet to be elevated to the dukedom, but the eleven anthems he commissioned from Handel are known as the Chandos Anthems, and these were almost certainly performed at the church with Handel directing the singers and small orchestra employed by his patron.

On the north side of the church is the Chandos Mausoleum, again built to the order of the first Duke of Chandos. The centrepiece documented by Grinling Gibbons, 1717, is a Baroque monument to the Duke and his first two wives, for which the Duke felt he had overpaid.  Burials here, in addition to James Brydges, 1st Duke of Chandos and his first two wives, include James Brydges, 3rd Duke of Chandos.

Barnet F.C.
Barnet F.C.'s training ground complex, The Hive, opened in the locality in 2009. The club constructed their new 5,176 capacity home ground at the site, which opened in summer 2013, and is shared with Tottenham Hotspur F.C. Women and London Bees.

Services and transport
The 79, 186 and 340 buses go past Canons Park tube station.

Housing

Notes

References 
 St Lawrence Little Stanmore
 Howard Colvin, 1995 (3rd ed.). A Biographical Dictionary of British Architects, 1660-1840. (Yale University Press): "John James"

External links
  Friends of Canons Park
 Canons Park Estate

Areas of London
Districts of the London Borough of Harrow
Parks and open spaces in the London Borough of Harrow
Grade II listed parks and gardens in London